The following is a listing of the sovereigns of the kingdoms in the Philippine archipelago before their dominions fell to either the Kingdom of the Spains and the Indies (in the 16th or 17th century) or the United States of America (in the 20th century), and of their non-sovereign descendants that kept honorary titles.

In Luzon and its peripheries

Kingdom of Luzon
The Kingdom of Luzon was described as one of the more powerful and wealthier kingdoms in the archipelago. It was noted for its commerce, literacy, diplomacy, navy, and use of artillery. Its dominion ranged at least from Mindoro to Kapampangan lordships, with possibilities of greater extent suggested by the name of the kingdom. These gradually fell to the Kingdom of the Spains and the Indies starting in 1570, just as the Kingdom of Luzon was starting to adopt Islam.

In the Visayan islands

Kingdom of Cebu
The Kingdom of Cebu was known for its military achievements and for having a large army. The male citizens of the kingdom were tattooed as marks of honour. Its dominion became a protectorate of the Kingdom of the Spains and the Indies in 1565 but fell to the said kingdom after 1570.

Principality of Mactan
Mactan is known to have had several lords at the same time, unlike most lordships in the neighbouring Cebu. Mactan is assumed to have had its own sovereign.

Kingdom of Bohol

Kingdom of Masawa

In Mindanao and its peripheries

Kingdom of Butuan and Calagan

Lordship of Iligan

Lordship of Cotabato

Sultanate of Maguindanao
The dominion of the Sultanate of Maguindanao gradually fell to the United States of America in the 1900s.

Lordship of Basilan and the Yakans

Sultanate of Sulu
The primary language of the Sultanate of Sulu is Tausug, with Malay and Arabic as secondary languages. The dominion of the sultanate gradually fell to the United States of America in the 1900s.

In Palawan and its peripheries

Eldership of the Tagbanwas of Coron

Appendix

Non-sovereign lordships

Lordship of Tondo

Title-bearing aristocratic descendants in Philippine republican rule

Lordship (Datu)

Some aristocratic descendants are officially granted leadership of particular communities by the Republic of the Philippines or unofficially still assume this role.

Muslim

Some Muslim aristocratic descendants who kept ancestral lordly titles have attempted to participate in the republican government and have served as either appointed or democratically elected public officials while they continued to assume roles as community leaders. There are also sometimes contending claimants to the titles. For aristocratic descendants, the following are several examples:

 Datu Pax S. Mangudadato – former Governor of Sultan Kudarat from 2001 to 2004
 The Sultanate of Maguindanao has an incumbent titular Sultan, Hajji Datu Amir bin Muhammad Baraguir – the 25th Sultan of Maguindanao. Son of Al-Marhum Sultan Hajji Datu Muhammad G.M. Baraguir, Llb. the 24th Sultan of Maguindanao
 The Maranaos have sixteen royal houses that rule the four principalities in what is referred to as the Confederation of Sultanates in Lanao.

Polytheistic ethnicities

 Datu Benhur – Lumad leader of the Banuaon tribe
 Datu Viloso Suhat, also known as Datu Lipatuan – a tribal leader from the Tinananon Menuvo tribe in Arakan, North Cotabato, and the first Lumad to sit in a local legislative body in central Mindanao.
 Datu Lamparan Talima Danda – the tribal chief from Subanen tribe, and a second generation descendant of  Timuay Danda Antanao from Kabasalan, Zamboanga Sibugay. Elected Mayor of Kabasalan, serving from 1961 to 1964. He was the Secretary General of United Subanen Community Association Inc.
 Datu Wilborne Sanghanan Danda – A Tribal Leader of the Peninusula, He became a Board Member of Sangguniang Panlalawigan of Zamboanga Sibugay (2000–2013), Elected Councilor for three terms, Elected Vice Mayor of Municipality of Kabasalan, Zamboanga Sibugay from year 2010–2013, He is the son of Datu Lamparan Talima Danda the Tribal Chieftain of Zamboanga Peninsula.
 Datu Wata Eduardo Lihao Danda- a tribal leader in charge of the communications for the entire Subanen Tribe. He functioned under Datu Lamparan Lihao Danda, his elder brother. He was enlisted into United States Armed Forces of the Far East (USAFFE) during World War II, attach to the Medical Detachment of 106th Infantry (Filipino) Division with rank of Corporal, and captured by the Japanese in May 1942. Datu Wata Eduardo was imprisoned in Camp 78 in Davao, escaped the same year and re-joined with US Army 41st Division. After the liberation of the Philippines from Imperial Japanese forces, he reenlisted to the Philippine Constabulary and retired in 1972. He served as the Secretary General of United Subanen Community Association, Inc. in Zamboanga Sibugay, succeeding his elder brother.
 Datu Labi José Lihao Cayon – a tribal chief of the Subanen tribe and the 1st cousin of Datu Wata Eduardo Lihao Danda and Datu Lamparan Lihao Danda
 Datu Wilfredo Lunsayan Sanggayan - a Municipal Councilor of the Municipality of Kabasalan, Province of Zamboanga del Sur for Three (3) consecutive terms from July 1, 1992 to June 30, 2001 (9 years); He also served as Provincial Board Member representing the Indigenous Peoples of the Province of Zamboanga Sibugay from July 2005 to October, 2012 and was recognized as the FIRST Indigenous Peoples Mandatory Representative (IPMR) of the Philippines in the Provincial level pursuant to RA 8371 otherwise known as the Indigenous Peoples Rights Act of 1997; Founding Chairman of the Provincial Indigenous Peoples' Organization of Zamboanga Sibugay, Inc. (PIPOZSI); Founding Chairman of Subanen Indigenous Peoples Association of the Philippines, Inc. (SIPAP); Founding Chairman of Subanen Partylist of the Philippines; He is the eldest son of late Timuay Langhap Pablo B. Sanggayan of Kabasalan, Zamboanga del Sur.
 Datu Labi Julius Mascarinas Cayon – board member of Zamboanga Sibugay Province And the Son of late Datu Labi JoseLihao Cayon, he is recognized as the Tribal Chieftain not just in Zamboanga Sibugay but entire Region 9 and partly in Region 10. "NCIP" - national commission on indigenous people, record section.
 Datu Lumok Imbing – 2nd cousin of Datu Laparam Talima Danda and a tribal leader from Subanen Tribe, who leads the aborigins of the Municipality of Lapuyan, Zamboanga Del Sur Province.
 Datu Langhap Dacanay – he is the 2nd generation of the royal blood stream and a 3rd degree relative of Datu Wilborne Sanghanan Danda
 Bae Sonita Manda Ryde – the 1st highest women handle the position she was proclaimed by former President Gloria Arroyo and she is in the 2nd generation royal blood stream a relative of Datu Lamparan T. Danda, Datu Wata Eduardo Lihao Danda and Datu Labi Jose Lihao Cayon

Eldership (Apo)

The following are present-day elders in ancestral domains as provided in the 1997 Act No. 8371 of the Republic of the Philippines "to recognise, protect, and promote the rights of the indigenous cultural communities".

 Apo Rodolfo Aguilar – a Tagbanwa principal elder of Coron island
 Apo Dr. Pio Lledo – a Tagbanwa elder of Calauit island

Listings from purely oral traditions and later histories

Lordship of Pampanga
The lord of this dominion is said to have been a sovereign.

Lordship of Taytay
The lord of this dominion is said to have been a sovereign.

Confederation of Majaas
These figures are based on Pedro Monteclaro's "Maragtas", a history of Panay published in 1907.

Lordship of Antique
The lord of this dominion is said to have been a sovereign.

Lordship of Mansasa, Tagbilaran, and Dauis
The lord of this dominion is said to have been a sovereign.

Lordship of Marawi
The lord of this dominion is said to have been a sovereign.

See also 

President of the Philippines
Governor General of the Philippines
Heads of state and government of the Philippines
List of sovereign state leaders in the Philippines
List of ancient Philippine consorts
 Indian honorifics, Filipino, Indonesian, Malay and Thai titles originated from these
 Thai honorifics
 Thai royal ranks and titles
 Malay styles and titles
 Filipino styles and honorifics
 Indonesian honorifics
 Greater India
 Indosphere

References 

Filipino royalty